Sterling Wildlife Management Area at  is an Idaho wildlife management area in Bingham County near the town of Aberdeen. The WMA consists of Idaho Department of Fish and Game and Bureau of Reclamation land along American Falls Reservoir. 

Surrounding cropland is managed cooperatively to provide cover for waterfowl and upland game birds. Ducks are common in the WMA, and there are opportunities for hunting.

References

Protected areas established in 1968
Protected areas of Bingham County, Idaho
Wildlife management areas of Idaho